Stéphane Denis (1949, St. Moritz) is a French journalist and writer.

Biography  
After working in ministerial offices in the late 1970s, he first worked for Le Quotidien de Paris, then for Paris Match, Marianne and le Figaro. He won the 2001 edition of the prix Interallié for his novel Sisters and the Prix Roger Nimier in 1994 for his work Les événements de 67.

In 1998, he was co-writer of the TV movie , realised by Bertrand Van Effenterre.

For several months he was a member of the radio show Les Grosses Têtes by Philippe Bouvard on RTL, in the middle of the 2000s.

He was an unsuccessful candidate for the Académie française in the chair #36 of Jean-François Deniau, in the election of 15 November 2007.

Works 
1981: La Chute de la maison Giscard, JC Lattès, .
1982: Sophie, ou, La Rive droite, Lattès, .
1983: La Leçon d'automne, Albin Michel, .
1985: Le Cœur net, la Table ronde, . 
1991: Feu de paille, Fayard, .
1992: L'Amoraliste, Fayard, .
1992: Mitterrand s'en va, under the pseudonym Manicamp.
1993: L'Affaire Poivre,  Stock, .
1994: Les Événements de 67, Plon, Prix Roger Nimier
1995: Histoire de France, Fayard, .
1996: Les Derniers Jours, Fayard, .
1997: Madame est morte, Fayard, .
1998: Un beau crime, Fayard, .
1998: People, Fayard, .
1998: Le Roman de l'argent, Albin Michel, .
1999: Chambres d'hôtes, Fayard, .
2000: La Grande Forme, Fayard, .
2000: Elle a maigri pour le festival, et d'autres nouvelles des gens célèbres, Fayard, (Prix Goncourt de la nouvelle)
2001: Sisters, Fayard, Prix Interallié
2002: Capitaine Troy : une enfance au temps du général, Fayard, .
2003: Charmant garçon, Fayard, .
2004: Les Immeubles Walter, Fayard, .
2004: Un mauvais sujet : chroniques 1993-2003, Fayard, .
2005: Minty, Fayard, .
2005: Chirac s'en va, Éditions Grasset, 2005  under the pseudonym Manicamp.
 Pauses, Fayard
2006: L'Enfance de l'art, 
2007: La Lutte des classes, 
2008: La Fin des journaux, 
2008: Un espion trop parfait, Fayard, 
2009: Un parfait salaud, Grasset, 
2010: L’Ennemi du bien, Grasset, 
2013: Les Dormeurs, Grasset, 
2015: La Tombe de mon père, Grasset, .

References

External links 
 Stéphane Denis on the site of Fayard
 Le journaliste Stéphane Denis affirme avoir averti M. Sarkozy en 2004 et 2005 on Le Monde
 Stéphane Denis on Valeurs actuelles
 Stéphane Denis on Le Figaro

20th-century French writers
21st-century French writers
20th-century French journalists
Prix Goncourt de la nouvelle recipients
Prix Interallié winners
Roger Nimier Prize winners
1949 births
Living people
Le Figaro people